Frank Schepke (5 April 1935 – 4 April 2017) was a German rower who competed for the United Team of Germany in the 1960 Summer Olympics.

He was born in Königsberg, Germany, in 1935. Kraft Schepke (born 1934) was his brother.

At the 1959 European Rowing Championships in Mâcon, he won a gold medal with the eight. At the 1960 Summer Olympics, he was a crew member of the German eight that won gold. At the 1961 European Rowing Championships in Prague, he won a gold medal with the coxed four. He was twice—in 1959 and in 1960—awarded the Silbernes Lorbeerblatt (Silver Laurel Leaf), the highest West German sports award.

Both he and his brother retired after the 1961 rowing season from competitive rowing. In the same year, he finished his PhD at the University of Kiel in agricultural sciences. He worked as a consultant for farmers, and later in life founded an industrial cleaning company. Aged 55, he fulfilled his lifelong dream of owning his own farm, and he produced biologically grown produce.

He stood in the 1965 West German federal election in the Stormarn – Herzogtum Lauenburg electorate for the National Democratic Party of Germany, a far-right and ultranationalist party founded the previous year. He left the party in 1969. At the 2009 and 2013 German federal elections, he stood as an independent in the Plön – Neumünster electorate. Schepke was the initiator in 2004 behind a regional currency KannWas for Schleswig-Holstein.

Schepke died on 4 April 2017 in Kiel.

References

1935 births
2017 deaths
Sportspeople from Königsberg
Olympic rowers of the United Team of Germany
Rowers at the 1960 Summer Olympics
Olympic gold medalists for the United Team of Germany
Olympic medalists in rowing
West German male rowers
Medalists at the 1960 Summer Olympics
University of Kiel alumni
National Democratic Party of Germany politicians
German farmers
European Rowing Championships medalists